Schoonmaker House is a historic home located at Selkirk in Albany County, New York.  It was built about 1860 and is a two-story brick farmhouse in the Italianate style.  It consists of a two-story main block with a two-story brick east wing and one-story frame south wing.

It was listed on the National Register of Historic Places in 2001.

References

Houses on the National Register of Historic Places in New York (state)
Italianate architecture in New York (state)
Houses completed in 1860
Houses in Albany County, New York
National Register of Historic Places in Albany County, New York